William Wiles (born 1971) is an American professional wrestler, better known by the ring names Billy Wiles and Bilvis Wesley. He is best known for his appearances in Extreme Championship Wrestling in the late 1990s and early 2000s, where he was part of the New Dangerous Alliance, often teaming with C. W. Anderson.

Professional wrestling career
Prior to first wrestling in a ring, Wiles was once a timekeeper. He then became a construction worker within Extreme Championship Wrestling, building up rings and working as a hauler backstage. Eventually he worked his way into the sport and his first known match in ECW was against Axl Rotten in a house show in Waltham, Massachusetts, in a losing effort. He wrestled  Sabu, Louie Spicolli and Balls Mahoney, but failed to defeat them. Wiles challenged Taz for the ECW World Television Championship in a singles match in the same venue in Waltham, Massachusetts to a losing effort.

Wiles would work alongside Lou E. Dangerously's Dangerous Alliance, teaming up with C. W. Anderson, proceeding to feud against Roadkill and Danny Doring and The Hardcore Chair Swingin' Freaks (Balls Mahoney and Axl Rotten). The brink of the feud with Roadkill and Doring happened at ECW Living Dangerously. Doring and Roadkill's manager Elektra turned on them, allowing Anderson and Wiles to pick up the win. Wiles soon left the Dangerous Alliance sometime after Cyberslam 2000 as a singles competitor, facing Nova, Michael Shane and Steve Corino in several matches on ECW Hardcore TV and ECW on TNN tapings. He formed a tag team with "The Prodigy" Tom Marquez dubbed as the Sideshow Freaks. They fought Doring and Roadkill, and Christian York and Joey Matthews. The team would eventually split up.

Wiles wrestled at the final Extreme Championship Wrestling pay-per-view event Guilty as Charged, scoring the victory against Mike Bell in a dark match.

Wiles appeared at the Legends of the Arena event at The Arena in Philadelphia on June 27, 2009, winning a match against The Musketeer, using New Jack's theme song for distraction.

Wiles now trains talent at the Monster Factory in Paulsboro, New Jersey with Danny Cage and The Blue Meanie.

Personal life
Prior to becoming a wrestler, Wiles was a drummer for a local band. He was good friends with fellow wrestler Balls Mahoney, whom he met during his sophomore year of high school. He cites Roddy Piper as his favorite wrestler.

Championships and accomplishments
Monster Factory Pro Wrestling
MFPW Tag Team Championship (1 time) (with Joe Gibson)

References

External links

 

1971 births
American male professional wrestlers
Living people
People from Brick Township, New Jersey
Professional wrestlers from New Jersey
Sportspeople from Ocean County, New Jersey
The Dangerous Alliance members